Zulfikar Ali Bhutto Jr. (born 1 August 1990), is a Pakistani visual artist, performance artist and curator. He is a member of the prominent political Bhutto family, and is the grandson of former President and Prime Minister of Pakistan, and his namesake, Zulfiqar Ali Bhutto. He is  younger brother of Fatima Bhutto and he is related to Benazir Bhutto and Bilawal Bhutto Zardari through his father's side. He has lived and worked in Karachi, Pakistan and San Francisco, California.

Early life and career
Bhutto was born on 1 August 1990 into the Bhutto family in Damascus, Syria. He is the son of Murtaza Bhutto, a politician who was assassinated when he was six years old, and Ghinwa Bhutto, who leads the Pakistan Peoples Party of Shaheed Bhutto. He has a half-sister, Fatima Bhutto, from his father's first marriage. His is of Pakistani descent from his father and has Lebanese ancestry from his mother's side. Bhutto was named after his grandfather Zulfikar Ali Bhutto, the former Prime Minister and President of Pakistan, and is the only male inherent of the Bhutto's family. His grandmother, Nusrat Bhutto, is of Iranian-Kurdish descent. The former Prime Minister of Pakistan, Benazir Bhutto is his paternal aunt, and her husband and former President of Pakistan, Asif Ali Zardari, is his uncle-by-marriage, while his father's brother, Shahnawaz Bhutto, is his uncle. The politician, Bilawal Bhutto Zardari, is his first cousin.

Bhutto received his Master of Fine Arts degree in 2016 from the San Francisco Art Institute. He has two undergraduate degrees from the University of Edinburgh.

Bhutto has worked on creative projects such as Mussalmaan Musclemen (2017), The Third Muslim: Queer and Trans Muslim Narratives of Resistance and Resilience (2018), The Alif Series (2019), and Tomorrow We Inherit the Earth (2019). In 2015, he exhibited an artworks titled ‘The Shrine’, which dealt with the subject of marginalised minorities in Pakistan through photo manipulation, portraiture and conceptual art. Artist and designer Hushidar Mortezaie has worked with Bhutto and designed some of his performance costumes.

In July 2022, he withdrew his participation from the Goethe Institute Film Fest in solidarity with Palestine, as Palestinian activist Mohammed El-Kurd was not invited. Additionally, writer Mohammed Hanif withdrew from the Goethe Institute conference.

Personal life
Bhutto currently lives in Karachi, Pakistan and belongs to the LGBTQ community, and identifies himself as queer.

References

Living people
1991 births
21st-century Pakistani male artists
Pakistani performance artists
Pakistani people of Iranian descent
Pakistani people of Kurdish descent
Pakistani people of Lebanese descent
Queer men
Queer artists
LGBT Muslims
San Francisco Art Institute alumni
Pakistani LGBT artists
Bhutto family
Pakistani emigrants to the United States
Asian-American drag queens
Pakistani drag queens
American performance artists
American people of Lebanese descent
American Muslims
People with acquired American citizenship
Alumni of the University of Edinburgh